The National Library and Archives of Iran (NLAI) or National Library of the Islamic Republic of Iran is located in Tehran, Iran, with twelve branches across the country. The NLAI is an educational, research, scientific, and service institute authorized by the Islamic Consultative Assembly. Its president is appointed by the President of Iran. The NLAI is the largest library in the Middle East and includes more than fifteen-million items in its collections.

History
Iran's national library and national archives began as separate institutions. In 2002, the two merged to form the National Library and Archives of Iran, but continue to operate in two independent buildings.

Library 
The prototype of a national library in Iran was the Library of Dar al-Funun College, established in 1851. The college's small library collection became the cornerstone of the National Library. In 1899, another institution called the Nation's Library opened in Tehran. 

In 1934, Mehdi Bayani became the director of the Public Library of Education. In his efforts to solve space problems at the Public Library of Education, he promoted establishing a National Library of Iran to Ali-Asghar Hekmat, then Minister of Education. The National Library of Iran was established in 1937. Mehdi Bayani served as the National Library's first director. 

André Godard, a French archaeologist and architect who designed the Museum of Ancient Iran, was asked to design a library building similar to the museum as the two would be adjacent. As the collection expanded, the library was housed in several buildings throughout Tehran. In 1994, the Commissioning Organization for Public State Buildings of Ministry of Housing and Urban Development held a national competition to design a new building.

The new building was constructed between 1996 and 2004 in Abbasabad, Tehran. Yousef Shariatzadeh (Persian:یوسف شریعت زاده), Mohsen Mirheydar, and  Yadollah Razaghi of Pirraz Consulting Planners, Architects and Engineers designed the building. which cost $53,930,769 USD. It was dedicated on March 1, 2004, by Seyed Mohammad Khatami, then president of the National and Collective Documents and Library, in a ceremony attended by foreign writers, publishers, and ambassadors. The new library building won a design award from the Environmental Engineering and Architecture Forum in 1997.

The National Library also includes twelve provincial branches: Boushehr, Ghazvin, Hamadan, Kerman, Isfahan, Mashhad, Rasht, Sari, Shiraz, Tabriz, Yazd, and Zahedan

Since 2004, the National Library of Iran has had a beneficial relationship with the Library of Congress.

Archives 
During the Qajar period, especially under Fath Ali Shah Qajar in the early 19th-century, documents were kept in the archives of the Biotat Office at the court. During the time of Nasser al-Din Shah in the mid to later 19th-century, political documents were stored at the Ministry of Foreign Affairs, and financial documents at the office of Mirza Yusuf Khan Mostofi al-Mamalik. In 1899, the Ministry of Foreign Affairs started following European archival methods by consolidating its archives and implementing the principles of document preservation. 

In 1966, a bill to create a National Archive Organization of Iran was introduced. In 1970, the National Assembly approved the law establishing this organization. National records are, "All records, correspondence, offices, files, photographs, maps, clichés, charts, films, tape recorders and other documents that have been prepared by the government or have reached the government and are constantly in the possession of the government."

Facilities 

The eight-story library building has . It is constructed of concrete that can withstand level nine-magnitude earthquakes. The overall design is organic and creates "an intimate and inviting atmosphere."

The building consists of fifteen halls:

 Kharazmi Hall: rare books and manuscripts
 Khajeh Nasir al-Din Tusi Hall: links
 Kamal al-Molk Forum: non-book resources
 Ibn Nandim Hall: reference and bibliography
 Razi Hall: science and technology
 Ibn Sina Hall: humanities
 Farabi Hall: social sciences and arts
 Mohaddes Armavi Hall: Iranian Studies and Islam Studies
 Rudaki Hall: special section for the enlightened and the disabled
 Kamaluddin Behzad Hall: non-book resources
 Parvin Etesami Hall: women's hall
 Digital Forum
 Public Library:  titles of Saadi and Hafez
 Children's Library
 Museum of Books and Documentary Heritage of Iran

Collections

The National Archives and Library of Iran houses three major collections: National Library, National Archive, and Digital.   

The National Library incorporates collections from many older libraries. The majority of the collection consists of books and manuscripts covering the writings of Iranian scholars in the fields of literature, history, philosophy, mysticism, jurisprudence, medicine, and astronomy.  

The collection also includes many rare and valuable manuscripts, such as calligraphy pieces by great masters. This Quran is important because of its antiquity and line cleanliness. 

According to the Deputy of the National Library in 2019, the collection included:
 2,841,665 books
 301,782 dissertations
 609,053 non-book resources, including photographs and CDs.
 4,000,000 magazines in 140,619 volumes, including 24,997 Latin and Arabic publications
 298,150 books for children and adolescents
 23,323 books for the blind, including books-on-tape, books-on-CD, and around 1,000 Braille books
 775 magazines for the blind and visually impaired
 55,000 old books, including 28,158 manuscripts and more than 26,000 lithographs featuring old lead printing
 An Iranian Studies collection that includes 80,410 books, 2,300 dissertations, and 6000 journals
 An Islam Studies collection with  8,203,238 books, magazines, and tapes
 The library has fourteen halls with fifteen million library items.

Publications
In 1962, the National Library took over the publication of the Iranian National Bibliography (Ketab-shenasi-e Melli-e Iran). It issued this annual publication between 1962 and 1966, changing to monthly and quarterly in 1969. The NLAI also publishes a Biannual Journal of Oral History Research.

See also
Central Library of Astan Quds Razavi
List of national libraries
International rankings of Iran

References

External links

Buildings and structures in Tehran
Education in Tehran
Architecture in Iran
Cultural organisations based in Iran
Libraries in Iran
Iran
Culture in Tehran
1937 establishments in Iran
Libraries established in 1937
Archives in Iran